Lucky Vatnani (born 23 December 1985) is an Indian former professional snooker player. He is from Hyderabad, India, but was based in Sheffield, England during his snooker career.

Career
Vantani, a graduate from Sheffield Hallam University in Business Administration, showed promise in his amateur career, with a 6–5 loss to Pankaj Advani in 2010 Indian Championship, as well as a run to the last 16 of the IBSF World Snooker Championship in 2009 and winning the gold medal in the British University Snooker Championships during the same year.

In 2011, he won a place on the World Snooker Tour for the 2011–12 season. However, he missed several events due to visa issues and would struggle and only won two matches, both in the qualifying stages of the Welsh Open and with three consecutive defeats to Adam Duffy in the first round of the World Open, China Open and World Snooker Championship ensured he was unable to reach the top 64 and therefore dropped of the tour at the end of the season.

Vantani competed as an amateur in the preliminary rounds of the 2013 World Snooker Championship, but lost 5–3 to Paul Wykes. He also attempted the regain his place on the tour via the Q School in 2012, 2013 and 2014, but was unsuccessful on each occasion.

In May 2018 he entered Q School in a bid to re-enter the professional snooker tour.

Performance and rankings timeline

Amateur Year by Year Performances

2015 Semi Finalist – Snooker Crown – All India open tournament – Delhi
2015 Quarter Finalist All India Invitational Snooker event – Chennai
2014 Top 16 World Snooker Championship – Bangalore
2013 APBSA Snooker event – Winner
2013 Indian Open pre-qualifying – Delhi – Qualifier
2013 Film Nagar Snooker event – Winner
2013 Simply Snooker Academy event – Winner
2013 All India Bhimavaram Invitational Snooker event – Winner
2012 79th Indian National Snooker Championship – Rank 6
2011 CCI Invitational Snooker Tournament – Quarter Finalist
2011 Shyam Shroff Memorial – Khar Gymkhana Invitational Snooker Tournament – Quarter Finalist
2010 77th Indian National Snooker Championship – Runner-up
2009 IBSF World Snooker (Men) Championship – Top 16
2009 76th Indian National Snooker Championship – Top 16
2009 BUCS Singles Snooker Championship – Gold Medalist
2009 CCI Platinum Jubilee Snooker Championship – Top 16
2008 75th Indian National Snooker Championship – Top 16
2008 3rd PCL-Manisha Invitation Snooker Championship – Runner-up
2008 Siri Fort Handicap Snooker Championship  – Winner
2007 74th Indian National Snooker Championship – Top 16
2006 India National Billiards & Snooker (U-21) Ranked 3
2006 AP State Senior Billiards & Snooker Championship – winner
2006 AP State Snooker (U-21) Champion
2005 AP State Snooker (U-21) Champion
2004 AP State Snooker (U-21) Champion
2003 AP State Snooker (U-21) Champion
2002 AP State Snooker (U-21) Champion
2001 AP State Snooker (U-21) Champion

References

External links
 Profile on worldsnooker.com
 
 Profile on Pro Snooker Blog

1985 births
Living people
Sportspeople from Hyderabad, India
Indian snooker players
Alumni of Sheffield Hallam University
Cue sports players from Telangana